
Gmina Mikołajki Pomorskie is a rural gmina (administrative district) in Sztum County, Pomeranian Voivodeship, in northern Poland.

Villages
Gmina Mikołajki Pomorskie contains the villages and settlements of Balewko, Balewo, Cierpięta, Cieszymowo Wielkie, Dąbrówka Pruska, Dworek, Kołoząb, Kołoząb Mały, Krasna Łąka, Krastudy, Linki, Mikołajki Pomorskie, Mirowice, Namirowo, Nowe Minięta, Perklice, Pierzchowice, Sadłuki, Stążki and Wilczewo.

Neighbouring gminas
Gmina Mikołajki Pomorskie is bordered by the gminas of Dzierzgoń, Prabuty, Ryjewo, Stary Dzierzgoń, Stary Targ and Sztum.

References
Polish official population figures 2006

Mikolajki Pomorskie
Sztum County